William Kerr (1836-1911) was an Irish-American architect.

Born in Ireland and educated in Natick and Boston, Massachusetts, he moved to Key West, Florida, in 1872, working as an architect, contractor, and builder. He built his Carpenter Gothic style cottage at 410 Simonton Street, the Convent of Mary Immaculate in 1878, was the superintendent during the construction of the Old Postoffice and Custom House, along with several other notable buildings in the town. His bust and a plaque are displayed in the old town's memorial cemetery.

1836 births
1911 deaths
Irish emigrants to the United States (before 1923)
Architects from Massachusetts
Architects from Florida
19th-century American architects
20th-century American architects
People from Key West, Florida